The Florida Black Heritage Trail includes sites related to Florida's African American leaders and communities.  It was the first trail to be included in the Florida Heritage Trails series.

References

External links
 Florida Black Heritage Trail (booklet)

African-American history of Florida
Historic trails and roads in Florida
Heritage trails